The 17th Arizona State Legislature, consisting of the Arizona State Senate and the Arizona House of Representatives, was constituted in Phoenix from January 1, 1945, to December 31, 1946, during the third of  Sidney Preston Osborn's four consecutive terms as Governor of Arizona. The number of senators and house members remained constant at 19 and 58, respectively. The Democrats controlled one hundred percent of the senate. while the Republicans gained a single house seat.

Sessions
The Legislature met for the regular session at the State Capitol in Phoenix on January 18, 1945; and adjourned on March 9. There were three special sessions, the first of which was held from September 10 through September 29, 1945, the second was held from April 23 – May 3, 1946, and the third was held between September 9 – 28, 1946.

State Senate

Members

The asterisk (*) denotes members of the previous Legislature who continued in office as members of this Legislature.

House of Representatives

Members
The asterisk (*) denotes members of the previous Legislature who continued in office as members of this Legislature.

References

Arizona legislative sessions
1945 in Arizona
1946 in Arizona
1945 U.S. legislative sessions
1946 U.S. legislative sessions